Pathiraja Mudiyanselage Kapuruhamy Tennekoon (born 16 May 1917) was a Ceylonese politician. He was the member of Parliament of Sri Lanka from Mihintale representing the Sri Lanka Freedom Party. He was defeated in the 1977 general election.

References

Members of the 4th Parliament of Ceylon
Members of the 5th Parliament of Ceylon
Members of the 7th Parliament of Ceylon
Sri Lanka Freedom Party politicians
1917 births

Date of death missing
Year of death missing